Orléans Loiret Basket, formerly known as Entente Orléanaise and Entente Orléanaise 45 Loiret, is a professional basketball club that is based in the city of Orléans, France. "45" is the number of Loiret. The club plays in the French Pro B League.

History

Entente Orléanaise was founded in 1993. The club was the French Cup runner-up and the French Pro B League champion in 2006. Orléans Loiret Basket competed in the French Pro A League for the first time in the 2006-07 season. In 2009 and 2010, the club was the French La Semaine des As Cup runner-up. In 2010, the club won the French Cup, which was the first national cup title win in their history.

Arenas
The club's home arena for French League national domestic games is the 3,222 seat Palais des Sports; for games that require a larger capacity (such as EuroLeague and EuroCup games) the club plays their home games at the 5,338 seat Zénith d'Orléans.

Honours and titles

Domestic
Pro B 
Champions (1): 2005–06
French Cup 
Winners (1): 2009–10

European record

Season by season

Players

Roster

Notable players

Head coaches
  Philippe Herve

External links
Official website
Eurobasket.com Team Page
Official Fan Site 

Basketball teams established in 1993
Orleans
Sport in Orléans